Iron Duke may refer to:

People 
 William Mark Duke (1879–1971), Archbishop of Vancouver
 Irvin Khoza (born 1948), South African football administrator
 John F. Thompson (politician) (1920–1965), U.S. politician
 Fernando Álvarez de Toledo, 3rd Duke of Alba (1507–1582), Spanish noble, general, and diplomat involved in the Eighty Years' War
 Luís Alves de Lima e Silva, Duke of Caxias (1803–1880), Brazilian army officer and politician
 Arthur Wellesley, 1st Duke of Wellington (1769–1852), British soldier and statesman
 Beltrán Alfonso Osorio, 18th duke of Alburquerque (1918–1994), Spanish noble and amateur jockey
 Robert William Wilcox (1855–1903), Hawaiian revolutionary soldier and politician

Ships 
 , any of several British Royal Navy ships
 HMS Iron Duke (1870), a battleship sold for scrap in 1906
 HMS Iron Duke (1912), the fleet flagship at the Battle of Jutland
 HMS Iron Duke (F234), a Type 23 frigate launched in 1991

Trains 
 GWR Iron Duke Class, a class of locomotive built by the Great Western Railway in England
 Iron Duke, a GWR 3031 Class locomotive built in 1892
 BR Standard Class 7 Iron Duke number 70014 built in 1951
 British Rail Class 87 Iron Duke number 87017 built in 1974

Other uses 
 Iron Duke engine, a 2.5 L I4 piston engine made by General Motors
 Iron Duke (pub), public house in Great Yarmouth, England

 The Iron Duke (film), 1934 film starring George Arliss
 The Iron Duke (novel), by L. Ron Hubbard
 The Iron Dukes, the name the 2nd Battalion 37th Armored Regiment
 1938 Duke Blue Devils football team, nicknamed the "Iron Dukes"
 Iron Duke, a large iron ore mine in South Australia

See also
 Iron Baron (disambiguation)
 Iron Lady (disambiguation)
 Iron Lord (disambiguation)
 Iron Man (disambiguation)
 Iron Woman (disambiguation)